3503 may refer to:

 The year in the 36th century
3503 Brandt asteroid
Hirth 3503 two stroke aircraft engine